Acentroscelus is a genus of South American crab spiders that was first described by Eugène Louis Simon in 1886. It is a senior synonym of Whittickius.

Species
 it contains eleven species, found in Guyana, Brazil, Peru, Argentina, and French Guiana:
Acentroscelus albipes Simon, 1886 (type) – Brazil
Acentroscelus gallinii Mello-Leitão, 1943 – Argentina
Acentroscelus granulosus Mello-Leitão, 1929 – Brazil
Acentroscelus guianensis (Taczanowski, 1872) – Peru, French Guiana
Acentroscelus muricatus Mello-Leitão, 1947 – Brazil
Acentroscelus nigrianus Mello-Leitão, 1929 – Brazil
Acentroscelus peruvianus (Keyserling, 1880) – Peru
Acentroscelus ramboi Mello-Leitão, 1943 – Brazil
Acentroscelus secundus Mello-Leitão, 1929 – Brazil
Acentroscelus singularis (Mello-Leitão, 1940) – Guyana
Acentroscelus versicolor Soares, 1942 – Brazil

See also
 List of Thomisidae species

References

Further reading

Araneomorphae genera
Spiders of South America
Thomisidae